Vasilyevskaya is a rural locality (a village) in Yavengskoye Rural Settlement, Vozhegodsky District, Vologda Oblast, Russia. The population was 2 as of 2002.

Geography 
The distance to Vozhega is 45 km, to Baza is 24 km. Ust-Votcha, Tarasovskaya, Maleyevskaya are the nearest rural localities.

References 

Rural localities in Vozhegodsky District